The Anzio 20mm rifle is an American anti-materiel rifle designed and marketed by Anzio Iron Works. It is the first American anti-materiel rifle designed and mass-produced for public sale with a bore diameter in excess of .50 caliber in over 80 years. The rifles are available in three calibers, with the rifle's predominant chambering being the 20mm Vulcan caliber.

Features 

Other notable features include an optional three-round detachable box magazine, a  barrel, and threaded muzzle to accept either a muzzle brake or suppressor.

Performance
This makes a 20mm Anzio rifle 5.85 times as powerful as a rifle chambered in .600 Nitro Express.

It does this by taking the .50 BMG projectile, which already is relatively large and travels extremely fast, and increases the already supersonic bullet to over 1.3 times its normal flight velocity, creating more kinetic energy without the need for a larger and heavier projectile. Though its kinetic energy is significantly lower than the 20mm round, it is almost as effective due to its smaller surface area, meaning that it has less material to punch through, making it easier to penetrate, but the lighter bullet makes transferring energy over longer distances and into targets less efficient.

Operator
 : The Federal Bureau of Investigation purchased two 20mm rifles from Anzio in 2009.

See also

Before 1945 
Lahti L-39
Solothurn S-18/1000

After 1945 
Arash anti-materiel rifle
Baher 23mm
Denel NTW-20
Istiglal AMR
Metallic RT-20

References

External links
Anzioironworks

Bolt-action rifles
14.5×114mm sniper rifles
20mm sniper rifles
20x102mm
Sniper rifles of the United States
Anti-materiel rifles